Raymond Gilbert Hunt (6 March 1918 – 5 March 1989) was an Australian rules footballer who played for Richmond in the Victorian Football League (VFL) and Glenelg in the South Australian National Football League (SANFL).

Hunt was a full back who played an attacking style.

During his 6 VFL games, in the 1943 season, he managed to kick 2 goals and play in the 1943 premiership side.

Hunt played 206 SANFL games for Glenelg (then a club record) and kicked 34 goals for both the Bays and the West Adelaide-Glenelg war time combination. He was Glenelg's best and fairest award recipient in 1939 and 1946, and was runner-up to Bob Hank of West Torrens in the 1946 Magarey Medal. He represented South Australia 8 times.

References

External links

1918 births
1989 deaths
Richmond Football Club players
Richmond Football Club Premiership players
Glenelg Football Club players
Australian rules footballers from South Australia
One-time VFL/AFL Premiership players